Gary Stephen Johnson (born 28 September 1955) is a former football player and is currently manager at Torquay United.

Johnson was formerly with Cambridge United, Kettering Town, Watford (as director of their youth academy), the Latvia national team, Yeovil Town in two spells, Bristol City, Peterborough United, Northampton Town and Cheltenham Town.

His son Lee is the head coach of Hibernian.CN

Playing career
Johnson signed for Watford as an apprentice at sixteen and turned professional at the age of eighteen. He then left Vicarage Road and moved to play football in Sweden for Malmö FF. After building up a successful football holiday business, Johnson then returned to England and played part-time football for Soham Town Rangers, Newmarket Town and Cambridge United.

After his playing career ended, Johnson spent the next six years training to earn his coaching badges and took his first managerial job at Newmarket Town in 1986.

Management career

Cambridge United
Johnson was the manager at Newmarket Town, when he was persuaded to join Cambridge United as reserve team manager in 1988. Appointed as assistant manager in 1990, Johnson helped John Beck organise the U's remarkable rise in the early 1990s, in which they came within two matches of becoming the first club to rise from the old Fourth Division to the top flight in successive seasons (Northampton Town having spent two seasons in both the third and second divisions before promotion to the first division in 1966). Johnson was briefly caretaker manager in late 1992 and then took charge from 1993 until 1995. Under Johnson's stewardship, the U's were contenders for a play-off place in Division Two in 1993–94, before eventually finishing tenth. The following season, many players were sold to balance the books and Johnson moved to take over at Kettering Town.

Kettering Town
After leaving Cambridge, Johnson took over as manager of Kettering Town as the club introduced full-time football for the first time in the club's history. However, once the decision was made to revert to being a part-time club, Johnson moved to Watford as director of their youth academy by request of former England manager Graham Taylor.

Latvia
He was approached by the Latvian football authorities for help, and became coach of their national team for two years from 1999 to 2001.

Whilst coaching Latvia, he spotted the potential of Marians Pahars and recommended him to Southampton's manager Dave Jones, who invited Pahars for a trial before signing him in March 1999. He also recommended Igors Stepanovs to Arsenal manager Arsène Wenger. 

Johnson left the job after Latvia drew 1–1 with San Marino. He then returned to England and eventually took over as manager of non-league side Yeovil Town.

Yeovil Town
In his first year in charge at Huish Park, the Glovers won the FA Trophy by beating Stevenage 2–0 in the final at Villa Park as well as finishing third in the Football Conference; the following year they won the greater prize of the Conference championship by a record margin of seventeen points and topping the hundred goals mark too, winning promotion to the Football League. Yeovil were immediately contenders in the League and after their debut season ended by missing out on the playoffs by goal difference, they were Division Three champions at the second attempt, scoring ninety goals in the process.

During a League Cup game against Plymouth Argyle, Johnson's son (Lee Johnson) accidentally scored a goal after attempting to play the ball back to Argyle's keeper (who had kicked the ball out because of an injury to a Plymouth player). In a show of good sportsmanship Gary Johnson told his players to allow Argyle to walk the ball into the net to level the score at 1–1, avoiding controversy. Yeovil went on to win the game 3–2, with Lee Johnson scoring a hat-trick.

Bristol City
Despite turning down an approach from Derby County in the summer of 2005, Johnson became Bristol City's target when their manager Brian Tinnion resigned that September. Yeovil agreed compensation terms and he became City's manager on 26 September 2005. Despite their lowly position of 22nd in the table, City's fortunes turned around under Johnson and a great run of form in the second half of the season saw them in play-off contention, eventually finishing ninth after a run of 55 points from 36 games.

Johnson won the League One Manager of the Month award for April 2006. After an impressive 2006–07 season (including an 18 match unbeaten run), Johnson won the award again in March 2007 after successfully guiding his side to 16 points from seven games the previous month. This had set Bristol City in a good spot to contend for automatic promotion, which they sealed on 5 May 2007 with a 3–1 home win over Rotherham on the last day of the season.

On 6 September 2007, Gary Johnson and assistant Keith Millen both signed -year contract extensions keeping them at the club until 2010.

In the 2007–08 season, he kept Bristol City in the top six of the Championship for almost the entire season and in the top two for a long time; the team were the surprise package of the season. Bristol City eventually lost the play-off final to Hull City at Wembley and were not promoted to the Premiership. Johnson made his players stay on the pitch after the match and watch the Hull City players celebrate as a motivational experience for the next campaign.

In the summer before the 2008–09 season, he broke the club record for a transfer fee in signing 21-year-old Nicky Maynard from Crewe Alexandra for £2.25 million.

Bristol City's once-famous chant of 'Johnson says bounce around the ground' was inspired by Gary Johnson who was quoted to saying in an interview before a league game that he wanted the fans bouncing around.

In September 2008, Johnson signed a new five-year contract with Bristol City, to keep him at the club until 2013. The club ended the season with another top ten finish and on 18 March 2010, with the club comfortably in mid table, the club issued a statement that Johnson had "left his post as manager of Bristol City by mutual consent".

Peterborough United
He was appointed manager of Peterborough United on a two-year contract on 6 April 2010.
With the club lying outside the playoff positions, Johnson left Peterborough on 10 January 2011. The reasons are that the manager and the chairman could not agree future policy.

Northampton Town
On 4 March 2011, Johnson was announced as the new manager of Northampton Town signing on a -year deal. His first season in charge almost saw the club relegated from the Football League. At the time of Johnson's appointment Northampton had only lost one of their previous seven games, but a disastrous run, in which the club went eleven games without a win, saw them slip down the table. Under Johnson they had only managed to pick up six points, and it was only by beating Stevenage in the penultimate game of the season that they secured their survival. Northampton Town and Johnson parted company by mutual consent on 14 November, the team having secured just four wins in the new campaign.

Yeovil Town
On 9 January 2012, Johnson returned to former club Yeovil Town, replacing Terry Skiverton who became Johnson's assistant. The Glovers, with Johnson at the helm, produced an impressive run of form with thirty points in nineteen games to reach safety with two games still left to play.

The 2012–13 season started well for Johnson at Yeovil where in early September, his side remained unbeaten in League One after four games and were top of the table as well as progressing in the Football League Trophy and narrowly losing 4–2 to West Bromwich Albion in the Football League Cup in the second round. There then followed six successive league defeats before the manager turned things round.

On 29 December 2012, Yeovil Town beat Portsmouth 2–1 at Fratton Park which was the start of a run of eight consecutive League One wins, a club Football League record. Johnson was nominated for the January Manager of the Month award but missed out with Dean Smith of Walsall the eventual winner.

On 6 May 2013, Yeovil defeated Sheffield United 2–1 on aggregate to reach the League One play-off final. On 19 May 2013, Johnson led Yeovil to a 2–1 victory over Brentford in the League One play-off final at Wembley Stadium which resulted in them being promoted to the Football League Championship for the first time in the club's history.

On 4 February 2015, with Yeovil bottom of the League One table Johnson was relieved of his duties.

Cheltenham Town
On 30 March 2015, Johnson was appointed as manager of League Two side Cheltenham Town, with the club bottom of the table two points from a position of safety. Despite Cheltenham's failure to avoid relegation, Johnson's contract was extended until the end of the 2016–17 season. The next season was a great success as the Robins won the National League championship title and an instant return to the Football League, the first time a relegated team had won the National League title since 1989, and Johnson became only the second manager to win multiple National League titles.

On 21 August 2018, Cheltenham Town announced they had 'parted company' with Johnson four games into the new season.

Torquay United

On 13 September 2018, Johnson was appointed as manager of Torquay United. He went on to guide them to the National League South title with three games remaining.

On 4 July 2019, Johnson signed a new contract at Torquay United.

Managerial statistics

Honours

Manager
Yeovil Town
League One play-offs: 2012–13
League Two: 2004–05
Football Conference: 2002–03
FA Trophy: 2001–02

Bristol City
Football League One runners-up: 2006–07

Cheltenham Town
National League: 2015–16

Torquay United
Conference South: 2018–19

Individual
Football Conference Manager of the Month (3): September 2002, March 2003, April 2003
Football Conference Manager of the Year: 2002–03
League One Manager of the Month (2): April 2006, March 2007

References

External links

1955 births
Living people
Footballers from Hammersmith
English footballers
Association football midfielders
Walton & Hersham F.C. players
Tooting & Mitcham United F.C. players
Soham Town Rangers F.C. players
Newcastle Town F.C. players
Crawley Town F.C. players
English football managers
Cambridge United F.C. managers
Kettering Town F.C. managers
Latvia national football team managers
Yeovil Town F.C. managers
Bristol City F.C. managers
Peterborough United F.C. managers
Northampton Town F.C. managers
Cheltenham Town F.C. managers
Torquay United F.C. managers
English Football League managers
National League (English football) managers
Expatriate football managers in Latvia
Cambridge United F.C. non-playing staff